Ali Alanç (born January 22, 1959) is a Turkish football manager. He is the head coach of the Izmir-based Konak Belediyespor since the 2015–16 season, which competes in the Turkish Women's First Football League.

Alanç serves also as the president of the Confederation of the Turkish Amateur Sports Clubs (ASKF), and a member of the Turkish Football Federation's executive board.

Alanç has been with Konak Belediyespor since 2007 managing the amateur football team. After taking over the leadership of the women's team from Hüseyin Tavur, who coached the team since the 2006–07 season and won three championships in a row, Alanç managed the team in three matches of the 2015–16 UEFA Women's Champions League qualifying round. His team won the champion title of the 2015–16 season for the fourth time. He will coach Konak Belediyespor at the 2016–17 UEFA Women's Champions League Group 9 matches.

Managerial statistics

Honours
Turkish Women's First Football League
Konak Belediyespor
 Winners (2): 2015–16, 2016–17
 Third places (1): 2017–18

References

Living people
1959 births
Sportspeople from İzmir
Turkish women's football managers
Konak Belediyespor